El Inca  is a 2016 Venezuelan drama film directed by . It was selected as the Venezuelan entry for the Best Foreign Language Film at the 90th Academy Awards, but it was not nominated.

Plot
The film tells the story of real-life professional boxer Edwin Valero, undefeated two-weight world champion. His meteoric career tragically ends after he is arrested on suspicion of killing his wife.

Cast
 Alexander Leterni as Edwin Valero
 Scarlett Jaimes as Joselin
 Miguel Ferrari as Zambrano
 Daniela Bueno as Wendy

See also
 List of submissions to the 90th Academy Awards for Best Foreign Language Film
 List of Venezuelan submissions for the Academy Award for Best Foreign Language Film
 List of banned films

References

External links
 

2016 films
2016 biographical drama films
2016 drama films
2010s sports drama films
Biographical films about sportspeople
Boxing films
Venezuelan drama films
2010s Spanish-language films
Cultural depictions of Venezuelan people
Cultural depictions of boxers